Ludovic Lamine Sané (born 22 March 1987) is a professional footballer who most recently played for FC Utrecht in the Eredivisie. He is primarily a centre-back but has also been used as holding midfielder. Born in France, he represented Senegal at international level.

Football career

Early career
Sané was born in Villeneuve-sur-Lot in southwestern France and began his football career playing for local club US Lormont on the outskirts of Bordeaux. He later joined Stade Bordelais before signing a contract with Championnat de France amateur club RCO Agde at the age of 19. Sané spent one season at Agde appearing in 25 matches scoring one goal. Following the season, he returned to Lormont and spent a season playing in the Division d'Honneur. During the summer of 2008, Sané jumped five divisions signing a three-year professional contract with Ligue 1 club Bordeaux.

Bordeaux
Sané initially played with the club's reserve team upon his arrival appearing in 15 matches during the 2008–09 season. While playing with the amateurs, the young player impressed manager Laurent Blanc and assistant Jean-Louis Gasset. For the 2009–10 pre-season, Sané featured regularly and performed well, most notably in a 3–1 win over Spanish club Athletic Bilbao after appearing as a second-half substitute. On 19 September 2009, Sané was called up to the first team for the first time for Bordeaux's league match against Boulogne. He didn't appear in the match, but eventually became a regular in the first 18 often appearing on the bench as a backup for French international Alou Diarra. On 3 November, Sané made his professional debut in the club's 2–0 victory over German club Bayern Munich in the UEFA Champions League appearing as a substitute in the 84th minute. The following month, he earned his first start playing the entire match in Bordeaux's 1–0 victory over Israeli club Maccabi Haifa. Sané made his league debut four days later in Bordeaux's important tie with Lyon. Bordeaux won the match 1–0 with Sané playing the full 90 minutes.

On 8 January 2010, Sané agreed to a contract extension with Bordeaux which will tie him to the club until 2014. He scored his first goal for Bordeaux in a 3–1 loss to Olympique de Marseille in a Coupe de la Ligue final at the Stade de France.

Werder Bremen
After spending seven senior years at Bordeaux, Sané departed the club and signed for Bundesliga side Werder Bremen for an undisclosed fee. In January 2018, the club's sporting director Frank Baumann announced that Sané would not be part of the team "for the time being" because he had been absent from training on two days without a valid excuse. Sané would also be allowed to settle his personal sporting future.

Orlando City
On 20 February 2018, Sané signed for Major League Soccer side Orlando City SC. He made his debut as a halftime substitute away to New York City on 17 March and scored his first goal for the club against Real Salt Lake in a 3–1 home victory on 6 May. After an injury-troubled first season with the club in which they set a new MLS record for goals conceded in a season, Sané formed a strong central partnership with Robin Jansson in 2019 and was a regular starter as Orlando turned things round defensively, conceding a team-record low number of goals. Despite this, on 21 November 2019, it was announced Sané had his contract option for the 2020 season declined by Orlando as part of the end-of-season roster decisions.

FC Utrecht
On 8 February 2020, Sané signed for FC Utrecht until the end of the season. He made his debut on 16 February as an 89th minute substitute against Willem II, entering with Utrecht leading 1–0. The game finished 1–1 after Willem II scored a stoppage time equalizer. Sané was an unused substitute in the next three league games as well as a 2–0 KNVB Cup semi-final win over Ajax before the season was canceled due to the COVID-19 pandemic in April. He was released at the end of his contract having made one appearance.

Personal life
Ludovic's younger brother Salif Sané is also a professional footballer and Senegalese international.

Career statistics

Club

Honours
Bordeaux
Coupe de France: 2012–13

References

External links
 
 
 

1987 births
Living people
People from Villeneuve-sur-Lot
Sportspeople from Lot-et-Garonne
Senegalese footballers
French footballers
Association football central defenders
Association football midfielders
Senegal international footballers
2012 Africa Cup of Nations players
2015 Africa Cup of Nations players
French sportspeople of Senegalese descent
Ligue 1 players
Bundesliga players
Major League Soccer players
Eredivisie players
RCO Agde players
FC Girondins de Bordeaux players
SV Werder Bremen players
Orlando City SC players
FC Utrecht players
Senegalese expatriate footballers
Senegalese expatriate sportspeople in Germany
Expatriate footballers in Germany
Senegalese expatriate sportspeople in the Netherlands
Expatriate footballers in the Netherlands
Footballers from Nouvelle-Aquitaine